Marshall Park is a five and a half acre urban park at 800 East Third Street in the Second Ward of Charlotte, North Carolina.  It features a large fountain and a lake, an amphitheater, a statue of Martin Luther King Jr., and a Holocaust memorial monument.  The park contains large open grassy areas with an unobstructed view of the Charlotte skyline. The Park is named for James B. Marshall, Sr., a former Charlotte city manager. Now owned by Mecklenburg County, the park is part of 17 acres of land the county is looking to sell to a developer. Under a 2018 agreement, Marshall Park would be replaced with a smaller 1.6 acre park.

Protest site
Because of its proximity to center city, Marshall Park is occasionally the site of protester camps and demonstrations, sometimes with the implied consent of local officials, such as during the 2012 Democratic National Convention.  On August 19, 2013 more than 2,000 people gathered in Marshall Park for a Moral Monday protest against actions by the recently elected Republican government of North Carolina.

References

Parks in Charlotte, North Carolina